Locust Grove is the name of a number of places in the United States of America:

Arkansas
 Locust Grove, Arkansas

Georgia
 Locust Grove, Georgia

Indiana
 Locust Grove, Warren County, Indiana (extinct)
 Locust Grove, Wayne County, Indiana

Kentucky
 Locust Grove, Clark County, Kentucky 
 Locust Grove, Pendleton County, Kentucky
 Historic Locust Grove, near Louisville, Kentucky

Maryland
 Locust Grove (La Plata, Maryland), listed on the NRHP in Charles County, Maryland
 five places named Locust Grove:
 two places in Garrett County, Maryland 
 in Kent County, Maryland 
 in Allegany County, Maryland
 in Washington County, Maryland

New Jersey
 Locust Grove, New Jersey

New York
 Locust Grove, New York (a section of Syosset, New York):
 Locust Grove (Poughkeepsie, New York), listed on the NRHP in Dutchess County, New York, also known as Samuel F. B. Morse House

North Carolina
 Locust Grove (Ingleside, North Carolina), listed on the NRHP in North Carolina

Ohio
 Locust Grove, Adams County, Ohio 
 Locust Grove, Licking County, Ohio 
 Locust Grove, Mahoning County, Ohio

Oklahoma
 Locust Grove, Oklahoma

Oregon
 Locust Grove, Oregon, a ghost town

Pennsylvania
 Locust Grove (Bainbridge, Pennsylvania), listed on the NRHP in Pennsylvania
 Locust Grove, Pennsylvania (four places):
 in Centre County 
 in Lancaster County 
 in Snyder County 
 in York County

Tennessee
 Locust Grove, Tennessee
 Locust Grove (Castalian Springs, Tennessee), listed on the NRHP in Tennessee

Texas
 Locust Grove (Jonesville, Texas)

Virginia
 Locust Grove (Amicus, Virginia), listed on the NRHP in Virginia
 Locust Grove (Dillwyn, Virginia), listed on the NRHP in Virginia
 Locust Grove (Charlottesville, Virginia), listed on the NRHP in Virginia
 Locust Grove (Lynchburg, Virginia), listed on the NRHP in Virginia
 Locust Grove, Orange County, Virginia
 Locust Grove (Page County, Virginia), a historic house
 Locust Grove (Purcellville, Virginia), listed on the NRHP in Virginia
 Locust Grove (Rapidan, Virginia), listed on the NRHP in Virginia